Richard Walker (1784 – 1 February 1855) was an English Liberal Party politician who sat in the House of Commons from 1832 to 1852.

Walker was born in Bury the eldest son of William Walker and his wife Mary Ormerod. His father was a woollen manufacturer and head of the family firm of William Walker and Sons of Stanley Street Bury.

Walker was elected at the 1832 general election as the Member of Parliament (MP) for the newly enfranchised borough of Bury in Lancashire, and held the seat until he stood down from the House of Commons at the 1852 general election.

Walker married Ann Scholes, daughter of John Scholes of Bury.

References

External links 

1784 births
Liberal Party (UK) MPs for English constituencies
UK MPs 1832–1835
UK MPs 1835–1837
UK MPs 1837–1841
UK MPs 1841–1847
UK MPs 1847–1852
Politics of the Metropolitan Borough of Bury
1855 deaths
People from Bury, Greater Manchester